Engulfment and cell motility protein 2 is a protein that in humans is encoded by the ELMO2 gene.

The protein encoded by this gene interacts with the dedicator of cyto-kinesis 1 protein. Similarity to a C. elegans protein suggests that this protein may function in phagocytosis of apoptotic cells and in cell migration. Alternative splicing results in multiple transcript variants encoding the same protein.

References

Further reading